Nature Biomedical Engineering is a monthly peer-reviewed scientific journal published by Nature Portfolio. It was established in 2017. The editor-in-chief is Pep Pàmies.

Abstracting and indexing 
The journal is abstracted and indexed in:
Science Citation Index Expanded
Scopus

According to the Journal Citation Reports, the journal has a 2021 impact factor of 29.234.

References

External links 
 

English-language journals
Nature Research academic journals
Online-only journals
Monthly journals
Publications established in 2017